Otishi National Park is a protected area in Peru, located in the regions of Junín and Cusco. It protects part of the Vilcabamba mountain range, preserving the wildlife and geological formations in this area.

See also
Asháninka
 Machiguenga

References

National parks of Peru
Geography of Junín Region
Geography of Cusco Region
Protected areas established in 2003
Tourist attractions in Cusco Region
Tourist attractions in Junín Region